Kuzomen is a rural locality (a selo) in Tersky District of Murmansk Oblast, Russia, located on the Kola Peninsula at a height of  above sea level. Population: 84 (2010 Census).

References

Notes

Sources

External links
A traveler's blog about Kuzomen

Rural localities in Murmansk Oblast